Paul Mwiru is a Ugandan lawyer and a politician. 

He currently serves as Member of Parliament elect for the Jinja municipality east constituency in Jinja City, in the eastern region of Uganda. He is affiliated to the Alliance for National Transformation (ANT) party. Mwiru successfully managed to retain his seat in the general elections in 2021, where he beat his close opponent of the National Resistance Movement's Nathan Igeme Nbeta.

Background and education 
Born on 12 August 1977 in Walukuba East in Jinja District, Mwiru went to Walukuba East Primary School where he did his primary living examination, before joining Jinja senior secondary school where he acquired both the Uganda Certificate of Education (UCE) and the Uganda advanced Certificate of Education (UACE). He thereafter sought after a diploma in law at the Law Advancement Centre. After some break of school, he returned to his quest for a bachelor's degree in law at Makerere University, which he got in 2010.

Political career 
His political career has so far been a short one, but he was a significant figure in Parliament during the amendment of the age limit bill, where he voted against its amendment.

References 

1977 births
People from Jinja District
Living people